The Northern Ireland Prison Service is an executive agency of the Department of Justice, the headquarters of which are in Dundonald House in the Stormont Estate in Belfast.

Background

It was established as an agency on 1 April 1995. Agency status was re-confirmed following a quinquennial review in 2000. The Prison Service is responsible for providing prison services in Northern Ireland. Its main statutory duties are set out in the Prison Act (Northern Ireland) 1953 and rules made under the Act.

The Prison Service is a major component of the wider criminal justice system and contributes to achieving the system's overall aims and objectives. As the responsible Minister, Minister of Justice accounts to Northern Ireland Assembly for the Prison Service and shares Ministerial responsibility and accountability for the criminal justice system as a whole with the Attorney General . The Prison Service is headed by the Director General. As of August 2009, the Northern Ireland Prison Service employed 1,893 staff.

Establishments

The Prison Service currently has three operational establishments:

HMP Maghaberry: a modern high-security prison housing adult male long-term sentenced and remand prisoners, in both separated and integrated conditions. Immigration detainees are accommodated in the prison's Belfast facility.
HMP Magilligan - a medium-security prison housing shorter-term adult male prisoners which also has low-security accommodation for selected prisoners nearing the end of their sentences;
HM Prison and Young Offenders' Centre, HMP Hydebank Wood - a medium-to-low-security establishment accommodating male young offenders and all female prisoners (including female immigration detainees).

There is also a staff training facility, the Prison Service College, at Hydebank Wood.

Prison Officers

Prison Officers operate the prisons and young offenders' centres. 
They wear a light blue uniform (similar but of a slightly lighter colour to HM Prison Service), consisting of a white shirt, blue tie, blue tunic and trousers (for males) and skirt (for females), black shoes or boots, black gloves and a blue peaked cap, with one style for males and another for females. Medals and a whistle on a chain are worn on the tunics.
For everyday use, the tunic may be replaced with a sweater or jacket and skirts with trousers.

Prison Officers may carry weapons and use reasonable force (as sworn constables) to protect people. They carry expandable batons.

Roles 
Operational Uniformed Prison Grades in descending order of rank are as follows:

 Governor in Charge
 Deputy Governor in Charge
 Functional Head
 Unit Manager
 Senior Officer
 Officers, including:
 Main Grade Officer
 Operational Support Grade
 Night Custody Officer
 Custody Prison Officer

The Prison Service also employs Prisoner Escorting and Custody Grades, which again are as follows in descending rank order:

 Principal Prisoner Custody Officer
 Senior Prisoner Custody Officer
 Prisoner Custody Officer
 Youth Supervision Officer

Officers killed in the line of duty

See also
Northern Ireland Department Of Justice
Attorney General for Northern Ireland
Advocate General for Northern Ireland
Northern Ireland Executive 
Northern Ireland Assembly
Police Service Northern Ireland

Her Majesty's Prison Service
Scottish Prison Service
Her Majesty's Inspectorate of Prisons
HM Prison
Her Majesty's Young Offender Institution
United Kingdom prison population
List of United Kingdom prisons
Prison categories in the United Kingdom
Young offender
OASys
Prisons in the Republic of Ireland

References

External links
Official website
Prison Act NI
On-line memorial to Prison Officers

Prison and correctional agencies
1995 establishments in Northern Ireland
Penal system in Northern Ireland
1995 in law
Government agencies established in 1995